Kevin Joseph may refer to:

 Kevin Joseph (baseball) (born 1976), American former baseball pitcher
 Kevin Joseph (cricketer) (born 1978), Trinidadian-born former British Virgin Islands cricketer

See also